Vyacheslav Valerievich Mashnov (born 9 May 1990) is a Russian hip-hop artist and streamer. Better known by stage names Slava KPSS, Gnoyny, Sonya Marmeladova, Valentin Dyadka, Ptichiy Pepel, Vorovskaya Lapa, Vyacheslav Karelin and others.

Biography 
Vyacheslav was born on 9 May 1990 in Khabarovsk. Studied at the Khabarovsk Institute of Infocommunications. Before the start of his musical career, Mashnov listened to rappers Noize MC, Kasta, Mnogotochie, as well as rock musicians: Yegor Letov, Boris Grebenshchikov, DDT, Zvuki Mu, Alisa, Agatha Christie and others.

In 2016, Mashnov, under the pseudonym Gnoyny, became a member of the creative rap association Antihype (which also included SD, Khan Zamai and Booker).

Attention to Vyacheslav grew after the battle against Ernesto Zatknites in July 2016, where he criticized Oxxxymiron, accusing him of hypocrisy and calling him "a hype-hungry pig". The next day, Miron Fedorov challenged Gnoyny to a battle in 2017.

The rap battle with Oxxxymiron, which became the most anticipated in Russia, took place within the 2nd season of Versus x #SlovoSPB on 6 August and was published on 13 August. Slava KPSS defeated Oxxxymiron with a score of 5:0. The video became resonant and gained about 10 million views in the first day after publication. After the battle he gave an interview to Yuri Dud for the Internet show "vDud".

Pseudonyms 
 Sulla MC was the first pseudonym used in 2009—2010.
 Slava KPSS (Glory to the CPSU) is the main pseudonym. It is a wordplay, the term slava can be used as glory to, but Slava is also a shortening of the name Vyacheslav. Rapper's father came up with such stage name.
 Gnoyny (Purulent) is used for rap battles.
 Ptichiy Pepel (Bird Ash) is the alternative pseudonym for battles.
 Sonya Marmeladova is used for BPM battles and grime songs. It is a reference to the character from Fyodor Dostoevsky's novel Crime and Punishment.
 Valentin Dyadka (Uncle Valentine) is used for parody songs, mashups and chastushki.
 Buter Brodsky (Sandwich Brodsky) is used in existential gloomy compositions with balalaikas. It is a wordplay, which consists of the word buterbrod (Russian for sandwich) and Joseph Brodsky's last name.
 Vorovskaya Lapa (Thieves' Paw) is used for parodying bad recitative, mumble rap and detroit rap.
 Big Baby Prilepin is used to mock rapper Big Baby Tape and writer Zakhar Prilepin.
 Gleb Minyokhin is used for 'strictly LGBT+' songs.
 There are also several less known and rarely used pseudonyms, such as Brick Bazuka, Valentina Matvienko, Valyazhny Tonny (Imposing Tonny), KPSS (CPSU), Sirenevaya Storona Yebla Opukhshaya (Lilac Swollen Side of the Kisser), Aval SSPK, MC Baklasan, Kostya Greben (Kostya the Comb), mc perez hilton (a wordplay constisting of Russian word for pepper and Paris Hilton), MC Kucheryavy (MC Curly), Leontyev Valera, Ochen' Priyatny Gremlin (Very Nice Gremlin,  a reference to Oxxxymiron's Gremlin's Little Song), Slava Siropchik (Slava the Syrup), MC Zhutkiy Rot (MC Creepy Mouth), mc calendula, MF Deripaska (MF Doom + Oleg Deripaska), Tragediya vsey zhizhi (the tragedy of slush, parody on a Russian underground rap band Tragediya vsey zhizni), MC Ashotik (was used for mocking Russian rapper Loc-Dog), Yelena Montana (Russian parodist Yelena Vorobey + Russian rapper Mozee Montana), Zamayskiy zhuk (a wordplay consisting of Zamay who is a Russian rapper and Slava's close friend and maybug), Ministerstvo haipa (Ministry of hype), LIL BAB, DJ Hattifnatt, Drenazhnaya voda A4 (A4 drainage water).

Political views 

On 6 February 2021 Mashnov was arrested for participating in a rally on February 2 in St. Petersburg. He received 7 days of administrative arrest for chanting the slogan "Lick, but don't bite. The clitoris is a delicate thing!"

In an interview with Ksenia Sobchak, he stated that he is a vegetarian and adheres to left-wing political views.

In May 2021, Vyacheslav announced that he would run for the State Duma of the Russian Federation from the Green Alternative party.

Discography

Studio albums

Mini albums

References 

1990 births
Living people
People from Khabarovsk
Russian rappers
Russian hip hop musicians
Russian hip hop
Russian podcasters